Carlos Lemos Jr. commonly known as Escorrega (born 9 April 1978 in Rio de Janeiro, Brazil) is a former mixed martial artist and 5th degree Brazilian jiu-jitsu (BJJ) black belt practitioner and coach.

A multiple-time world champion in the sport, Lemos Jr. is also regarded as one of the first black belts to come over to Europe to coach and establish Jiu Jitsu academies. Lemos Jr is the Regional Director of Gracie Barra in the Chicago area.

Biography 
Carlos Lemos Jr. was born on 9 April 1978 in Rio de Janeiro, Brazil. He started taekwondo at the age of three, progressing to judo at ten. He began training Brazilian jiu-jitsu at the age of 14. From blue belt he started training under Carlos Gracie Jr earning all his belts from him. He became a World Champion for the first time at the 1999 World Jiu-Jitsu Championship as a purple belt. In 2011 he briefly competed in MMA, winning both of his two fights.

Lemos Jr. won another World championship this time in Masters in 2015 and again in 2018 earning him his fourth world title. He is currently the head instructor of Gracie Barra Downers Grove in Downers Grove, Illinois.

Brazilian Jiu-Jitsu competitive summary 
Main Achievements (black belt level):
 IBJJF World Champion (2002)
 IBJJF American No-Gi Champion (2009)
 IBJJF European Champion (2004)
 Brazilian Teams Champion (2003)
 IBJJF Pan American Master Champion (2015)
 IBJJF Chicago Open Master Champion (2010 Open Weight)
 IBJJF Chicago Summer Open No-Gi Champion (2014)
 IBJJF Chicago Summer Open Champion (2014)
 IBJJF Chicago Winter Open No-Gi Champion (2013 absolute)
 2nd place IBJJF World Championship (2003)
 2nd place IBJJF Chicago Open Championship (2012)
 2nd place IBJJF Chicago Winter Open No-Gi Championship (2013)
 2nd place IBJJF American No-Gi Championship (2009 Open weight)
 3rd place IBJJF World Championship (2005)

Main Achievements (Colored Belts):
 IBJJF World Champion (1999 purple)
 IBJJF Pan American Champion (2000 brown)
 3 X Brazilian National Champion (1996,1998,1999)
 3rd place IBJJF World Championship (2000 brown)

Instructor lineage 
Mitsuyo Maeda > Carlos Gracie Sr. > Carlos Gracie Junior > Carlos Lemos Jr

Mixed martial arts record 

|-
|Win
|1–0
|Jason Rine
|Submission (Rear-Naked Choke)
|TFC
|
|1
|1:59
|
|
|-
|Win
|2–0
|Mike Phillips
|Decision (Unanimous)
|TFC
|
|3
|5:00
|
|

References 

Living people
Brazilian male mixed martial artists
Mixed martial artists utilizing taekwondo
Mixed martial artists utilizing judo
Mixed martial artists utilizing Brazilian jiu-jitsu
Brazilian male judoka
Brazilian male taekwondo practitioners
Brazilian practitioners of Brazilian jiu-jitsu
Sportspeople from Rio de Janeiro (city)
People awarded a black belt in Brazilian jiu-jitsu
1978 births